U.S. Città di Palermo played the season 2003-04 in the Serie B league and Coppa Italia.

Summary
Ambitious Palermo, for the first time since 1973, failed to gain promotion to Serie A in the previous season following a 3-0 away defeat in the final match against Lecce, which were promoted at Palermo's place. That dramatic defeat was also the last appearance in his playing career for team captain Antonino Asta, who seriously injured during the match and did not manage to recover; he was part of the first team squad in the season 2003-04, without however making a single appearance. Following the events, Palermo made a number of prominent signings in the summer market, such as Eugenio Corini, Andrea Gasbarroni and Luca Toni; in addition, Palermo-born star Gaetano Vasari agreed to join the rosanero with a salary based on the number of appearances he would have made in the season. Silvio Baldini was appointed as new boss to replace Nedo Sonetti. Several football pundits suggested Palermo to be the real favourite team to win the Serie B league because of the quality of its roster.

The team made a very impressive start by defeating Gianfranco Zola's Cagliari Calcio, and managed to be always in the promotion spots. However, following a surprising 3-1 home defeat to Salernitana that brought Palermo down to third place, Baldini heavily criticized club chairman Maurizio Zamparini who consequently fired him and appointed Francesco Guidolin at his place. On the last day of the January transfer market, three new notable signings were made: Antonio Filippini, Emanuele Filippini and Fabio Grosso. Palermo later returned to top the table and eventually won the league, ending with the same points than Cagliari, but being crowned as Serie B champions due to head-to-head matches and promoted to Serie A after 31 years in the lower divisions.

Squad

Transfers

Winter
In

Out

Competitions

Serie B

League table

Results by round

Matches

Statistics

Players statistics

References

Palermo F.C. seasons
Palermo